Epimorius caribellus is a species of snout moth in the genus Epimorius. It was described by Douglas C. Ferguson in 1991 and is known from Dominica.

References

Moths described in 1991
Tirathabini
Moths of the Caribbean